David Mathebula (born on 24 June 1983) is a retired South African football player who played as midfielder.

Coaching career
Retiring in the summer 2018, Mathebula was appointed an assistant coach to Sello Chokoe at Tshakhuma. He left the club in January 2019 and was then appointed manager of Black Aces in February 2019.

On 1 October 2019, Mathebula returned to Tshakhuma as an assistant coach on an interim basis under caretaker manager Phuthi Mohafe until a suitable replacement for Moma Medic was found following his sacking. Only eight days later, Erol Akbay was appointed new manager of the club and it was reported, that Mathebula's future was unclear.

References

External links

1983 births
Living people
People from Makhado Local Municipality
Tsonga people
South African soccer players
Association football midfielders
Kaizer Chiefs F.C. players
Moroka Swallows F.C. players
Mpumalanga Black Aces F.C. players
Dynamos F.C. (South Africa) players
SuperSport United F.C. players
National First Division players
South African Premier Division players
Sportspeople from Limpopo